The Fast Worker is a 1924 American silent comedy film directed by William A. Seiter and starring Reginald Denny, Laura La Plante, and Ethel Grey Terry.

Cast

Preservation
Prints of The Fast Worker are located in the collections of the UCLA Film and Television Archive and EYE Film Institute Netherlands.

References

Bibliography
 Goble, Alan. The Complete Index to Literary Sources in Film. Walter de Gruyter, 1999.

External links

Lobby cards at silenthollywood.com

1924 films
1924 comedy films
Silent American comedy films
Films directed by William A. Seiter
American silent feature films
1920s English-language films
Universal Pictures films
American black-and-white films
1920s American films